Grizzly Man (2005) is an American documentary film by German director Werner Herzog. It chronicles the life and death of bear enthusiast Timothy Treadwell and the death of his girlfriend Amie Huguenard at Katmai National Park, Alaska. The film includes some of Treadwell's own footage of his interactions with brown bears before 2003, and of interviews with people who knew or were involved with Treadwell, in addition to those of professionals who deal with wild bears.

Treadwell and his girlfriend, Amie Huguenard were both from New York. He had been studying bears for several summers at the park. They were attacked and killed by a bear there on October 5, 2003. Treadwell's footage was found after his death. The couple's remains were discovered by a pilot.

The bear that killed Treadwell and Huguenard was later encountered and killed by the group who retrieved the pair’s partially consumed remains. An audio recording of the attack was captured by Treadwell's camera, but has never been released. The final film was co-produced by Discovery Docs, the Discovery Channel's theatrical documentary unit, and Lions Gate Entertainment. The film's soundtrack is by British singer-songwriter and guitarist Richard Thompson.

Synopsis
Herzog used sequences extracted from more than 100 hours of video footage shot by Treadwell during the last five years of his life. He also conducted and filmed interviews with Treadwell's family and friends, and bear and nature experts. Park rangers and bear experts commented on statements and actions by Treadwell, such as his repeated claims that he was defending the bears from poachers. Park rangers noted that there had never been a recorded incident of poaching at Katmai National Park.

Treadwell also claimed that he had "gained the trust" of certain bears, sufficient to approach and pet them. Park rangers pointed out that bears are wild and potentially dangerous animals; given that, Treadwell was lucky to have survived as long as he had without being mauled. One park ranger suggested that the bears were so confused by Treadwell's direct, casual contact that they were not sure how to react to him. Other park rangers note that the bears were not threatened by poachers, but that Treadwell's actions put them at real risk of harm and death. By familiarizing them with human contact, he increased the likelihood that they would approach human habitation seeking food, and cause a confrontation in which humans would kill them.

In 2003, Treadwell was camping in Katmai National Park with his girlfriend, Amie Huguenard.  Treadwell usually left the park at the end of summer but that year stayed into early October. This put him and Huguenard at greater risk, as in this period, bears are aggressive about searching for food to store up calories for hibernation during the winter. Herzog speculates that their staying later in the season ultimately resulted in the couple's being attacked and killed. 

Willy Fulton was the pilot who discovered the few remains of the couple and reported to the National Park Service. He notes that he saw a lone man's arm with a wristwatch, and could not keep the image out of his mind. After an investigation, the coroner and park police gave the wristwatch to Jewel Palovak, an ex-girlfriend of Treadwell. He had bequeathed her his belongings. These included his video camera, which captured an audio record of the attack. 

In addition to presenting views from friends and professionals, Herzog narrates and offers his own interpretation of events. He concluded that Treadwell had a sentimental view of nature, thinking he could tame the wild bears. Herzog notes that nature is cold and harsh; Treadwell's view clouded his thinking and led him to underestimate danger, resulting in his death and that of Huguenard.

Palovak gave permission to Herzog to listen to the audio record of the attack. He refrained from making this a part of the film, but was filmed while listening, and showed how this distressed him. Herzog initially advised Palovak to destroy the audio recording rather than listen to it or keep it. 

In a later interview, he repudiated his own advice, saying it was:
Stupid ... silly advice born out of the immediate shock of hearing—I mean, it's the most terrifying thing I've ever heard in my life. Being shocked like that, I told her, 'You should never listen to it, and you should rather destroy it. It should not be sitting on your shelf in your living room all the time.' [But] she slept over it and decided to do something much wiser. She did not destroy it but separated herself from the tape, and she put it in a bank vault.

Production
Treadwell spent thirteen summers in Katmai National Park and Preserve, Alaska. Over time, he believed the bears grew to trust him; they allowed him to approach them and he had touched them. He gained some national notoriety for his work with the bears and founded Grizzly People with his friend Jewel Palovak. They worked to protect bears in national parks by raising awareness.

Park officials repeatedly warned him that his interaction with the bears was unsafe to both him and to the bears. "At best, he's misguided," Deb Liggett, superintendent at Katmai and Lake Clark national parks, told the Anchorage Daily News in 2001. "At worst, he's dangerous. If Timothy models unsafe behavior, that ultimately puts bears and other visitors at risk."  

Treadwell filmed his exploits, and used the films to raise public awareness of the problems faced by bears in North America. In October 2003, at the end of his thirteenth visit, he and his girlfriend Amie Huguenard were attacked, killed, and partially eaten by a bear. The events that led to the attack are unknown.

Producer Erik Nelson had begun work on developing a narrative television special based on Treadwell's life and career. However, during a chance encounter with German director Werner Herzog at the Jackson Hole Wildlife Festival, Nelson was persuaded to turn the project into a feature-length documentary and to give Herzog directing duties. With the project being developed as a documentary, they contacted Jewel Palovak in order to use Treadwell's archival footage.

Palovak, co-founder of Grizzly People and a close friend of Treadwell's, had to give her approval for the film to be produced, as she controlled his video archives. The filmmakers had to deal with logistical as well as sentimental factors related to Treadwell's footage of his bear interactions. Grizzly People is a "grassroots organization" concerned with the treatment of bears in the United States. After her friend's death, Palovak was left with control of Grizzly People and Treadwell's 100 hours of archival footage.  As his close friend, former girlfriend, and confidante, she had a large emotional stake in the production. She had known Treadwell since 1985 and felt a deep sense of responsibility to her late friend and his legacy.

Palovak said that Treadwell had often discussed his video archives with her. "Timothy was very dramatic," she once said. She quoted Treadwell as saying, "'If I die, if something happens to me, make that movie. You make it. You show 'em.' I thought that Werner Herzog could definitely do that."

Release
Grizzly Man premiered at the 2005 Sundance Film Festival and its limited US theatrical release began on August 12, 2005. It was later released on DVD in the United States on December 26, 2005. The Discovery Channel aired Grizzly Man on television on February 3, 2006; its three-hour presentation of the film included a 30-minute companion special that delved deeper into Treadwell's relationship with the bears and addressed controversies related to the film.

The DVD release lacks an interview with Treadwell by David Letterman, which was shown in the original theatrical release. Letterman had joked that Treadwell would be eaten by a bear. The versions televised on the Discovery Channel and Animal Planet both retain this scene.

Response

Box office
Grizzly Man opened on August 12, 2005 in 29 North America venues. It grossed US$269,131 ($9,280 per screen) in its opening weekend, ranking number 26 in the box office. At its widest point, it played at 105 theaters, and made US$3,178,403 in North America during its run, with $882,902 overseas for a worldwide total of $4,061,305.

Critical reception
Upon its North American theatrical release, Grizzly Man was acclaimed by critics. On Rotten Tomatoes, the film has a 92% "Certified Fresh" score based on 136 reviews, with an average rating of 8/10. The site's consensus states: "Whatever opinion you come to have of the obsessive Treadwell, Herzog has once again found a fascinating subject." Metacritic reports an 87 out of 100 rating based on 35 critics, indicating "universal acclaim".

David Denby of The New Yorker said:

Narrating in his extraordinary German-accented English, Herzog is fair-minded and properly respectful of Treadwell's manic self-invention. He even praises Treadwell as a good filmmaker: as Treadwell stands talking in the foreground of the frame, the bears play behind him or scoop up salmon in sparkling water; in other shots, a couple of foxes leap across the grass in the middle of a Treadwell monologue. The footage is full of stunning incidental beauties.

Film critic Roger Ebert, a longtime supporter of Herzog's work, awarded the film four out of four stars.
'I will protect these bears with my last breath', Treadwell says. After he and Amie become the first and only people to be killed by bears in the park, the bear that is guilty is shot dead. Treadwell's watch, still ticking, is found on his severed arm. I have a certain admiration for his courage, recklessness, idealism, whatever you want to call it, but here is a man who managed to get himself and his girlfriend eaten, and you know what? He deserves Werner Herzog.

Charlie Russell, a naturalist who studied bears for many years, lived near them and raised them for a decade in Kamchatka, corresponded with Treadwell and wrote about the film:
Herzog is a skillful filmmaker so a large percentage of those who watch the movie Grizzly Man, overlook Timothy's amazing way with animals even though to me this stands out very strongly. The fact that Timothy spent an incredible 35,000 hours, spanning 13 years, living with the bears in Katmai National Park, without any previous mishap, escapes people completely. Even with his city-kid background, I found myself mesmerized by what he could do with animals.

The film placed at No. 94 on Slant Magazines best 100 films of the 2000s.

Awards
 Nominated for the Gotham Award for Best Documentary
 Won the Los Angeles Film Critics Association Award for Best Documentary/ Non-Fiction Film
 Won the New York Film Critics Circle Award for Best Non-Fiction Film
 Won the San Francisco Film Critics Circle Award for Best Documentary
 Won the Alfred P. Sloan Prize and was nominated for the Grand Jury Prize at the 2005 Sundance Film Festival
 Won the Toronto Film Critics Association Award for Best Documentary
 Won the Anugerah Seri Angkasa 2008 Angkasapuri.

References

Further reading 
 Conesa-Sevilla, J. (2008). "Walking With Bears: An Ecopsychological Study of Timothy (Dexter) Treadwell",  The Trumpeter, 24, 1, 136–150.
 Dewberry, Eric. "Conceiving Grizzly Man through the 'Powers of the False' ", Scope (Nottingham University), 2008

External links

 
 
 
 
 Roger Ebert's review
 Peter Bradshaw's review
 Regarding the Pain of Others:Grizzly Man by Laurie Stone nthWORD Magazine Shorts

2005 documentary films
2005 films
Alfred P. Sloan Prize winners
American documentary films
Biographical documentary films
Documentary films about Alaska
Documentary films about bears
Environmental films
Environment of the United States
Films directed by Werner Herzog
Films set in Alaska
Films shot in Alaska
Grizzly bears in popular culture
Lionsgate films
Katmai National Park and Preserve
Sundance Film Festival award winners
Collage film
2000s English-language films
2000s American films